Aya Darwish (born 17 November 1994) is an Egyptian synchronized swimmer.

References 

1994 births
Living people
Egyptian synchronized swimmers
Olympic synchronized swimmers of Egypt
Synchronized swimmers at the 2012 Summer Olympics